Ruth Conniff is an American progressive journalist who served as editor-at-large of The Progressive. and is now the editor-in-chief of the Wisconsin Examiner. Conniff has also written for The Nation and the New York Times among other publications.

Early life 
Conniff was born and raised in Madison, Wisconsin. She attended Yale University where she ran track and edited the campus magazine The New Journal. She completed a B.A. in philosophy cum laude in 1990. She resides in Maple Bluff, Wisconsin.

Career 
Previously the political editor of The Progressive, Conniff was named editor-in-chief in 2013. According to her byline at The Progressive: "Ruth Conniff covers national politics for The Progressive and is a voice of The Progressive on many TV and radio programs.  Conniff was a regular on CNN’s Capital Gang Sunday and is now a regular on PBS’s To the Contrary.  She also has appeared frequently on C-SPAN’s Washington Journal and on NPR and Pacifica."

Conniff is editor-in-chief of the Wisconsin Examiner. Shortly after Donald Trump took office she moved with her family to Oaxaca and covered Mexico–United States relations, the migrant caravan, and Mexico’s efforts to grapple with Trump. Conniff is a frequent guest on MSNBC and has appeared on Good Morning America, Democracy Now!, Wisconsin Public Radio, CNN, Fox News and many other radio and television outlets. She has also written for The Nation, The New York Times, The Washington Post, and The Los Angeles Times, among other publications.

Personal life 
Conniff resides in Maple Bluff, Wisconsin.

References

External links

American magazine editors
Women magazine editors
Living people
Writers from Madison, Wisconsin
People from Maple Bluff, Wisconsin
Year of birth missing (living people)
Yale College alumni
21st-century American women writers
The New York Times writers
American women journalists
21st-century American journalists
The Nation (U.S. magazine) people
The Washington Post journalists
Journalists from Wisconsin